Kouh-Ouest is a departments of Logone Oriental Region in Chad.  Its chief town is Béboto.

Subdivisions 
The department of Kouh-Ouest is divided into 3 sub-prefectures:

 Béboto
 Baké
 Dobiti

Administration 
Prefect of Kouh West (since 2008)

 October 9, 2008: Djimalde N'Demra

References 

Departments of Chad